Proactenis is a genus of moths belonging to the subfamily Tortricinae of the family Tortricidae.

Species
Proactenis leucocharis (Meyrick, 1933)
Proactenis sisir Diakonoff, 1941
Proactenis tricomma Diakonoff, 1941
Proactenis uniata Diakonoff, 1960

See also
List of Tortricidae genera

References

External links
tortricidae.com

Tortricidae genera